Latorp is a village of Örebro Municipality in Sweden. It is located about 12 kilometers west of Örebro, and has a population of about 500. Recently the local inhabitants saved a local school by protesting against its permanent closure with the help of 130 liters of popcorn. Latorp was also the centre for a campaign in 2004 against the Tysslinge area becoming a city of its own. The village has a very active community council (Swedish: Byalag). Among the task of the community council is to arrange culture festivals. A minority of the inhabitants belong to the ELIM church. Latorps lies halfway between Örebro and the Ånnaboda skiing resort.

External links
Swedish language page

Populated places in Örebro County
Populated places in Örebro Municipality

sv:Latorp